Golemo Selo is a small village located between the towns of Dupnitsa and Bobov Dol in Kyustendil Province, western Bulgaria. The village name means "big village". The population of the village is 573 inhabitants (according to the Bulgarian National Statistical Institute data 2007). At the borders of the village, to the south-west, is situated the Bobov Dol Power Plant.

The area has been proven to be inhabited from ancient times. The ruins of the palace of Aron of Bulgaria was found near the village. He was killed along with his family nearby by orders of his brother Samuil on 14 June 976 because of treason.

External links
Bobovdol municipality website
Information about the village from Guide-Bulgaria.com
Големо Село
Bulgarian National Statistical Institute

Footnotes

Villages in Kyustendil Province